Sajjo Rani is a 1976 Bollywood film directed by Govind Saraiya.

Cast
 Ramesh Deo  
 Romesh Sharma   
 Rehana Sultan
 Urmila Bhatt
 Satyen Kappu
 Shamim Bano
 Seema Deo
 Sumati Gupte
 Jayshree T.
 Shekhar Purohit
 Sajjan
 Amrit Patel

Soundtrack
"Saiyyan Ke Gaon Mein Taaro Ki Chhaav Mein" - Asha Bhosle
"Jiya Mane Nahi Khadi Taako Saiyya" - Asha Bhosle
"Mori Bali Umariya Kharab Kini Balma" - Asha Bhosle
"Paao Mein Payal" - Asha Bhosle
"Saanson Mein Chandan Sa, Aankho MeinKajal Sa" - Aarti Mukherjee
"Nathaniya Ne Hai Ram" - Shobha Gurtu
"Dil Hai Haazir Lijiye" (version 1) - Shobha Gurtu
""Dil Hai Haazir Lijiye" (version 2) - Shobha Gurtu

External links
 

1976 films
1970s Hindi-language films
Films scored by Sapan-Jagmohan